The simple-station Campín is part of the TransMilenio mass-transit system of Bogotá, Colombia, opened in the year 2005.

Location
Campín is located north of downtown Bogotá, specifically on Avenida NQS with Calle 53B.

History
This station opened in 2005 as part of the second line of phase two of TransMilenio construction, opening service to Avenida NQS. It serves the Estadio El Campín—from which it gets its name—and the surrounding neighborhoods.

Station Services

Old trunk services

Trunk services

Feeder routes
This station does not have connections to feeder routes.

Inter-city service
This station does not have inter-city service.

References

See also
 Bogotá
 TransMilenio
 List of TransMilenio Stations

TransMilenio